Ebrahim Sadeghi (born February 4, 1979, in Karaj, Iran) is an Iranian football coach and retired player who played for Saipa for 17 years.

Sadeghi has been playing for Saipa since 2000. In 2010, Saipa Cultural and Athletic Corporation celebrated a testimonial ceremony for him because of "his loyalty to the club", calling him The Orange Loyal. He was also gifted a Saipa Tiba.

On 13 December 2015, in a match against Esteghlal Ahvaz Sadeghi played his 400th league match for the club, becoming the only player in the history of the Persian Gulf Pro League to reach this feat. He retired on 4 May 2017 after playing 17 seasons at Saipa at the top flight.

Club career

Youth career
Sadeghi joined Keshavarz at the age of thirteen and played at the club until 1995 where he was spotted by Persepolis and joined their academy. After three years at Persepolis he joined Moghavemat Tehran before settling at Saipa a year later.

Saipa
Sadeghi graduated from the Saipa youth ranks and was signed to the club in 2000. He has played for Saipa for his entire. His good performances since 2006–07 season made big clubs to show some interest on him. In 2008 Sadeghi was nominated for Asian Footballer of the Year, but failed to win the award. He played in AFC Champions League for Saipa and continued to play for the club in 2008–09 season.

Club career statistics

 Assist Goals

International career
He made his first cap for Iran national football team in January 2007 in a friendly match against the UAE. He scored in his debut. He was selected among Iran's final squad participating in the 2007 Asian Cup.
He has been called up for 2010 FIFA World Cup Qualifying. Sadeghi played in West Asian Football Federation Championship 2008 and won the cup.

International goals
Scores and results list Iran's goal tally first.

Managerial statistics

Honours

Club
Saipa
Iran Pro League (1): 2006–07

National
Iran
WAFF Championship (1): 2008

Asian player of the year nomination
In April 2008, Sadeghi has been nominated for the 2008 Asian footballer of the year, as the sole Iranian player in the 21-player list of AFC.

References

Iranian footballers
People from Karaj
1979 births
Living people
Iran international footballers
2007 AFC Asian Cup players
Association football midfielders
Persian Gulf Pro League players
Saipa F.C. players
21st-century Iranian people